
Hans Ernst Arnold Felix Bütow (28 December 1894 – 9 May 1974) was a German admiral during World War II. He was a recipient of the Knight's Cross of the Iron Cross of Nazi Germany.

Awards

 Wehrmacht Long Service Award 1st Class (1 April 1939)
 Sudetenland Medal (30 October 1939)
 Clasp to the Iron Cross (1939) 2nd Class (14 April 1940) & 1st Class (1 August 1940)
 Order of the Cross of Liberty 1st Class with Swords (12 October 1941)
 Knight's Cross of the Iron Cross on 12 March 1941 as Kapitän zur See and Führer der Torpedoboote (leader of torpedo boats)

References

Citations

Bibliography

 
 
 

1894 births
1974 deaths
People from Kłodzko County
People from the Province of Silesia
Imperial German Navy personnel of World War I
Reichsmarine personnel
Counter admirals of the Kriegsmarine
Recipients of the clasp to the Iron Cross, 1st class
Recipients of the Order of the Cross of Liberty, 1st Class
Recipients of the Knight's Cross of the Iron Cross
German prisoners of war in World War II